Slaughterhouse Rulez is a 2018 comedy horror film directed by Crispian Mills. Written by Mills and Henry Fitzherbert, the film's cast features Asa Butterfield, Finn Cole, Hermione Corfield, Michael Sheen, with Nick Frost and Simon Pegg.

Slaughterhouse Rulez was released on 31 October 2018 in the United Kingdom and on 17 May 2019 in the United States.

Plot

After his father dies, Donald Wallace (Finn Cole), a teenager from a working-class family, enrolls in an exclusive public school called Slaughterhouse, where he struggles to fit in. The school houses a few secrets, such as the recent suicide of a pupil last term, mysterious disappearances, an overzealous house prefect who descends from a long line of war criminals, and an enigmatic new sinkhole, caused by the Headmaster’s (Michael Sheen) money-making scheme: fracking. Aggressive subterranean creatures emerge from the sinkhole and start attacking members of the faculty. Wallace then rallies a group of pupils to fight the monsters. The film ends with the monsters' defeat, the explosion of the school, and the remaining students walking away. Meanwhile, the Headmaster's dog, and Meredith, who survived the attack, witness the school's destruction.

Cast

Production
This is the first film from Stolen Picture, a film and TV production company formed by Simon Pegg and Nick Frost. The film was produced by Catalyst Global Media and Sony Pictures International, and was shot at Stowe School, Windsor Great Park, and Chislehurst Caves, among other locations.

Release
The film was released in the United Kingdom and Ireland on 31 October 2018.

Reception

Critical response
The website's critics consensus reads: "An uneven blend of horror and comedy that fails to satisfy on either front, Slaughterhouse Rulez aims for B-movie fun but doesn't make the grade." 
On Metacritic the film has a score of 39% based on reviews from 6 critics, indicating "generally unfavorable reviews."

The film generated revenue of £737,670 from cinemas worldwide.

Marketing
The first trailer of the film was released online (initially via Twitter) on 9 August 2018.

References

External links
 

2018 films
2018 horror films
British comedy horror films
British high school films
British teen horror films
2010s English-language films
Films scored by Jon Ekstrand
Films set in the United Kingdom
LGBT-related comedy horror films
2010s British films